El ahijado de la muerte ("The Godson of Death") is a 1946 Mexican film. It was the first film to be written by Luis Alcoriza, co-written with his wife Janet Alcoriza, loosely based on the story by the brothers Grimm.

External links
 

1946 films
1940s Spanish-language films
Mexican black-and-white films
Mexican fantasy films
1946 fantasy films
Films directed by Norman Foster
1940s Mexican films